Portrait of a Serial Monogamist is a Canadian romantic comedy film, which premiered on the LGBT film festival circuit in 2015 before going into general theatrical release in 2016.

Written and directed by John Mitchell and Christina Zeidler, the film stars Diane Flacks as Elsie Neufeld, a lesbian who breaks up with her latest girlfriend Robyn (Carolyn Taylor) and accepts a dare from her friends to stay single for five months instead of rushing into a new relationship. However, she finds her resolve tested by the arrival of new love interest Lolli (Vanessa Dunn), as well as the nagging suspicion that breaking up with Robyn may have been a mistake.

The film's cast also includes Gavin Crawford, Sabrina Jalees, Grace Lynn Kung, Raoul Bhaneja, Robin Duke, Aurora Browne and Elvira Kurt.

References

External links 
 

2015 films
Canadian romantic comedy films
Canadian LGBT-related films
LGBT-related romantic comedy films
2015 LGBT-related films
2015 romantic comedy films
English-language Canadian films
2010s English-language films
2010s Canadian films